The 2005 V-League was the inaugural season of the V-League, the highest professional volleyball league in South Korea. The season began on 20 February 2005 to 8 May 2005. Games were played at venues in Daejeon, Incheon, Cheonan and Gumi.

The inaugural season champions are Samsung Bluefangs for men's while KT&G for women's.

Teams

Men's clubs

Women's clubs

Regular season

League table (Male)

League table (Female)

Final stage

Bracket (Male)

Bracket (Female)

Top Scorers

Men's

Women's

Player of the Round

Men's

Women's

Final standing

Men's League

Women's League

Awards

Statistics leaders

Men's
 Best Scorer
  Lee Gyeong-su (LIG Greaters) – 521 points
 Best Spiker
  Hu In-jeong (Hyundai Capital) – 53.99% success rate
 Best Blocker
  Lee Sun-kyu (Hyundai Capital) – 0.93 blocks/set
 Best Server
  Lee Gyeong-su (LIG Greaters) – 0.27 serves/set
 Best Setter
   (Hyundai Capital) – 8.66 sets/set
 Best Defender
  Lee Young-su (Sangmu) – 6.19% success rate
 Best Libero
  Yeo Oh-hyun (Samsung Fire) – 6.51% success rate

Women's
 Best Scorer
  Jung Dae-young (Hyundai Hillstate) – 319 points
 Best Spiker
  Kim Se-young (KT&G) – 39.04% success rate
 Best Back Attacker
  Hwang Youn-joo (Heungkuk Life) – 100 score
 Best Blocker
  Jung Dae-young (Hyundai Hillstate) – 0.76 blocks/set
 Best Server
  Hwang Youn-joo (Heungkuk Life) – 0.31 aces/set
 Best Setter
  Kim Sa-nee (Korea Expressway) – 8.36 sets/set
 Best Defender
  Jung Dae-young (Hyundai Hillstate) – 4.09% success rate
 Best Libero
  Nam Jie-youn (GS Caltex KIXX) – 6.38% success rate

Non-recorded

Men's
 Regular Round – Most Valuable Player
  Hu In-jeong (Hyundai Capital)
 Final Stage – Most Valuable Player
  Kim Se-jin (Samsung Fire)
 Popularity Award
  Lee Gyeong-su (LIG Greaters
 Fair Play Award
  Lee Ho-nam (Korean Air)
 Best Rookie Award
  Ha Hyun-yong (LIG Greaters)

Women's
 Regular Round – Most Valuable Player
  Jung Dae-young (Hyundai Hillstate)
 Final Stage – Most Valuable Player
  Choi Kwang-hee (KT&G)
 Popularity Award
  Choi Kwang-hee (KT&G)
 Skill Development Award
  Kim Min-ji (GS Caltex KIXX)
 Fair Play Award
  Lim Hyo-sook (KT&G)
 Best Rookie Award
  Hwang Youn-joo (Heungkuk Life)

References

External links
 Official website 

2005 in volleyball
V-League (South Korea)